A total solar eclipse occurred at the Moon's descending node of the orbit on June 30, 1954. A solar eclipse occurs when the Moon passes between Earth and the Sun, thereby totally or partly obscuring the image of the Sun for a viewer on Earth. A total solar eclipse occurs when the Moon's apparent diameter is larger than the Sun's, blocking all direct sunlight, turning day into darkness. Totality occurs in a narrow path across Earth's surface, with the partial solar eclipse visible over a surrounding region thousands of kilometres wide. Occurring only 3.1 days after perigee (Perigee on June 27, 1954), the Moon's apparent diameter was larger. Totality lasted 2 minutes and 34.93 seconds, but at sunrise 1 minute and 8.6 seconds and at sunset 1 minute and 5.3 seconds. The moon's apparent diameter was larger, 1930.2 arc-seconds.

Visibility 
Totality began at sunrise over the United States over Nebraska, South Dakota, Minnesota, and Wisconsin, and crossed into Canada, across southern Greenland, Iceland and Faroe Islands, then into Europe, across Norway, Sweden, and eastern Europe. It ended before sunset over Iran, Afghanistan, Pakistan, and ending in northwestern India. The southwestern part of Vilnius, northeastern part of Kiev, southwestern part of Baku were covered by the path of totality.

The northeastern part of Mount Elbrus, the highest mountain in Europe, also lies in the path of totality.

Related eclipses

Solar eclipses of 1953–1956

Saros 126

Metonic series

Inex series

See also 
 List of solar eclipses visible from Russia
 List of solar eclipses visible from the United Kingdom
 Allais effect

Notes

References

 Photo from Russia
 Solar eclipse of June 30, 1954 in Russia
 Photo of Solar eclipse
 BBC: 1954: Three continents see eclipse of sun (Article and video)
 http://retrofutureground.tumblr.com/post/99724896027/bill-seaman-story-of-eclipse-in-one-picture

1954 06 30
1954 in science
1954 06 30
June 1954 events